William Lynn "Chip" Campbell Jr. (born January 4, 1969) is an American attorney and judge. He serves as  United States district judge of the United States District Court for the Middle District of Tennessee.

Education
He earned his Bachelor of Science in political science from the United States Naval Academy. He served seven years in the United States Marine Corps, principally as a Naval Flight Officer. He received his Juris Doctor from the University of Alabama School of Law, where he served as editor-in-chief of the Alabama Law Review and was an inductee of the Order of the Coif.

Career 
He worked as an associate and later a partner in the Nashville firm of Riley Warnock & Jacobson, PLC, and as an associate in the Birmingham, Alabama, office of Maynard, Cooper & Gale, P.C. Before becoming a judge, he was a member in the Nashville office of Frost Brown Todd, LLC, where he handled civil litigation.

Federal judicial service 
On July 13, 2017, President Donald Trump nominated Campbell to serve as a United States District Judge of the United States District Court for the Middle District of Tennessee. On September 6, 2017, the Senate Judiciary Committee held a hearing on his nomination. On October 5, 2017, his nomination was reported out of committee. On January 8, 2018, the United States Senate invoked cloture on his nomination by a 89–1 vote. On January 9, 2018, his nomination was confirmed by a 97–0 vote. He received his judicial commission on January 12, 2018.

On July 24, 2020, Campbell blocked part of Tennessee's abortion law that would ban abortions in the early stages of pregnancy.

References

External links
 
 William L. Campbell Jr. at U.S. District Court for the Middle District of Tennessee
 

1969 births
Living people
21st-century American lawyers
21st-century American judges
Alabama lawyers
Judges of the United States District Court for the Middle District of Tennessee
People from Nashville, Tennessee
Tennessee lawyers
United States district court judges appointed by Donald Trump
United States Naval Academy alumni
United States Marine Corps officers
University of Alabama School of Law alumni